Williams Carter Wickham (September 21, 1820 – July 23, 1888) was a Virginia lawyer and politician. A plantation owner who served in both houses of the Virginia General Assembly, Wickham also became a delegate to the Virginia Secession Convention of 1861, where he voted against secession, but after fellow delegates and voters approved secession, he joined the Confederate States Army and rose to the rank of cavalry general, then became a Confederate States Congressman near the end of the American Civil War. Later, Wickham became a Republican and helped rebuild Virginia's infrastructure after gaining control of the heavily damaged Virginia Central Railroad, which he repaired and helped merge into the Chesapeake and Ohio Railway company. Cooperating with financier Collis Huntington, Wickham developed coal resources and the Newport News Shipyard. He was also again elected to the Virginia Senate. His son Henry T. Wickham also became a lawyer and would work with his father and eventually twice become the speaker pro tempore of the Virginia Senate.

Early and family life
Wickham was born in Richmond, Virginia, the son of William Fanning Wickham and Anne Butler (née Carter) Wickham. His paternal grandfather John Wickham was a prominent Richmond lawyer and slaveowner who had moved from New York state to Richmond following the American Revolutionary War. His great-grandfather had been an Anglican minister in New York state, so he had relatives there. On his mother's side, Wickham descended from the First Families of Virginia, specifically the Nelson and Carter families prominent in the Virginia Colony.

One of Wickham's maternal great-grandfathers, Gen. Thomas Nelson, Jr., had signed the Declaration of Independence as a Virginia delegate and served as governor of Virginia during the American Revolutionary War. Thomas "Scotch Tom" Nelson was one of the founders of Yorktown in the late 17th century. Wickham was also descended from Robert "King" Carter (1663–1732), who served as an acting royal governor of Virginia and was one of its wealthiest landowners (and largest slaveowners) in the late 17th and early 18th centuries. His mother was a first cousin of Robert E. Lee, whose mother Anne Hill (née Carter) Lee, was born at Shirley Plantation.

Hickory Hill was long an outlying appendage to Shirley Plantation, much of it having come into possession of the Carter family by a deed dated March 2, 1734.

Wickham received a private education appropriate to his class, then traveled to Charlottesville for further studies. He graduated from the University of Virginia.

He married Lucy Penn Taylor and had several children, including Henry T. Wickam discussed below who followed his father's legal and political career path.

Career

Admitted to the Virginia bar in 1842, Wickham had a private legal practice, as well as operating plantations acquired through his marriage and using the profits of his legal practice. Meanwhile, his father W.F. Wickham continued to operate Hickory Hill, which was one of the two largest plantations in Hanover County, and with over 200 enslaved people by 1860, among the largest in the state, even though it raised comparatively little tobacco. W.C. Wickham became a local justice in Hanover County. Hanover County voters elected Wickham to the Virginia House of Delegates in 1849 (although he only served a single term) and together with Henrico county voters, elected him to the Virginia Senate a decade later.

In 1858, as planters responded to John Brown's raid on Harpers Ferry, Wickham recruited a cavalry company in Hanover County, the "Hanover Dragoons" and accepted a commission as captain of Virginia volunteer militia.

In 1861 Henrico County voters elected Wickham as one of their delegates to the Virginia Secession Convention of 1861. A Unionist, Wickham twice voted against the articles of secession.

Civil War

Following Virginia voters' approval of secession, Wickham took his company, the Hanover Dragoons, into the Confederate States Army. After participating in the First Battle of Manassas, Wickham was commissioned by Governor John Letcher as lieutenant colonel of the Fourth Virginia Cavalry in September 1861. On May 4, 1862, he incurred a severe saber wound during a cavalry charge at the Battle of Williamsburg and was captured while recovering at Hickory Hill, but quickly paroled.

In August 1862, Wickham received a promotion to Colonel of the Fourth Virginia Cavalry. At the Battle of Sharpsburg, he was wounded again, this time in the neck by a shell fragment. Recovering, he participated in the battles of Chancellorsville and Brandy Station and the Gettysburg Campaign. General Wade Hampton blamed the failures of Wickham's Fourth Virginia Cavalry at Brandy Station in June 1863 for the death of his brother, Lt. Col. Frank Hampton.

Despite Hampton's enmity, following the Battle of Gettysburg, Wickham was promoted to brigadier general on September 9, 1863, and put in command of what became known as Wickham's brigade of Fitzhugh Lee's division. On May 11, 1864, he fought at the Battle of Yellow Tavern. Maj. Gen. J.E.B. Stuart was mortally wounded during this engagement, with his final order being: "Order Wickham to dismount his brigade and attack." In September 1864, after the Confederate defeat at the Battle of Fisher's Hill, Wickham blocked at Milford an attempt by Maj. Gen. Philip Sheridan to encircle and destroy the Confederate forces of Maj. Gen. Jubal Early. Wickham then attacked the Federal cavalry at Waynesboro and forced them to retreat to Bridgewater.

Wickham resigned his commission on October 5, 1864, and took his seat in the Second Confederate Congress, to which he had been elected while in the field. Recognizing that the days of the Confederacy were over, he participated in the Hampton Roads Conference in an attempt to bring an early end to the war.

Postbellum activities
After the Confederacy surrendered, Wickham used his family's New York connections to reorganize Virginia's economy, which had been ruined by the war. He ultimately became a Republican and voted in 1872 for General Ulysses S. Grant as a member of the Electoral College from Virginia.

In November 1865, Wickham became president of the Virginia Central Railroad, which had been one of the most heavily damaged during the War. In 1868, the Virginia Central merged with the Covington and Ohio Railroad to form the new Chesapeake and Ohio, and Wickham became the new company's president. He worked to complete a railroad line to the Ohio River, long a dream of Virginians. However, unlike fellow Confederate officer and railroad leader William Mahone, Wickham was initially unable to secure capital or financing in Virginia, or from Europeans.

Turning to New York City, Wickham worked with an investment group headed by Collis P. Huntington. Fresh from recent completion of the western portion of the U.S. transcontinental railroad as a member of the so-called "Big Four", Huntington became the C&O's new president. His contacts and reputation helped obtain $15 million of funding from New York financiers for the project, which eventually cost $23 million to complete.

After Huntington assumed the presidency, Wickham remained with the C&O as vice-president from 1869 to 1878, when the company went into foreclosure following a national panic, with Wickham as receiver. In 1878 the Chesapeake and Ohio Railroad was reorganized as the Chesapeake and Ohio Railway Company, with Collis P. Huntington assuming the office of President of the reorganized road; Wickham became second vice-president. Under their leadership, an additional line was extended east from Richmond through the new Church Hill Tunnel and down the Virginia Peninsula through Williamsburg to reach coal piers located on the harbor Hampton Roads, the East Coast of the United States' largest ice-free port at the small unincorporated town of Newport News in Warwick County. Before the war, the Gosport Shipyard in Portsmouth had served the U.S. Navy, and then the Confederate Navy until Federal forces gained control of the Hampton Roads area, so skilled labor was available. During the ten years from 1878 to 1888, the C&O also developed coal resources in the Appalachians and shipped them eastward. Coal became a staple of the C&O's business at that time, and still was over 125 years later under successor CSX Transportation. Huntington developed his holdings in Newport News, founding the Newport News Shipbuilding and Drydock Company and helped the small community become one of only two in Virginia to become an independent city without first having been an incorporated town. In modern times, Newport News, which merged with the former Warwick County in 1958, has grown to become one of the major cities of Hampton Roads.

Throughout the years after the Civil War, while developing railroads (and remaining an officer of the C&O), Wickham continued active in politics. He maintained an office in Richmond even while officially residing in Hanover County. He was elected chairman of the Hanover County, Virginia, Board of Supervisors in 1871. In 1883, Hanover County voters (this time together with Caroline County voters) again elected as Wickham to the Virginia Senate (still a part-time position), and re-elected him in 1887.

Death and legacy
Wickham died of heart failure on July 23, 1888, at his Richmond office, and was interred in Hickory Hill Cemetery in Hanover County near Ashland. The general's comrades and C&O employees gave a statue of Williams Carter Wickham to the City of Richmond in 1891, which was placed in Monroe Park. Two of the general's descendants, who do not represent the entire family, called for the statue's removal in the aftermath of Charlottesville, Virginia's 2017 Unite the Right rally, and participants in 2020's George Floyd protests defaced and toppled the statue from its pedestal.

See also

References

External links
 
 

1820 births
1888 deaths
19th-century American railroad executives
Chesapeake and Ohio Railway
Confederate States Army generals
Members of the Confederate House of Representatives from Virginia
University of Virginia alumni
Virginia lawyers
Virginia Secession Delegates of 1861
19th-century American politicians
Politicians from Richmond, Virginia
People from Hanover County, Virginia
Lawyers from Richmond, Virginia
Deaths from organ failure
19th-century American lawyers